Michael Levy could refer to: 

Michael Levy, Baron Levy (born 1944), British music industry executive and life peer
Michael R. Levy (born 1946), American magazine publisher
Michael M. Levy (19502017), American professor of English and philosophy
Mickey Levy (born 1951), Israeli politician
Mike Levy (active since 1994), American businessman
Michael George Levy (1925–2007), British-Canadian military officer

See also
Michael Levey (1927–2008), English art historian
Mike Levey (1948–2003), American infomercial host